The Institut national supérieur de formation et de recherche pour l'éducation des jeunes handicapés et les enseignements adaptés or INS-HEA (National Higher Institute for Training and Research for the Education of Young Disabled Persons and Special Education) is a public college in Suresnes. It is part of the Université Paris Lumières.

INSHEA has its buildings next to the Fort Mont-Valérien, in Suresnes. About eighty Academics train National Education staff in the fields of disability and difficulty of schooling.

References

External links
 Official website

Educational institutions established in 1954
1954 establishments in France
Education in Île-de-France
Suresnes